Kim Jo-sun (1765 — 1832) was a Korean political figure during the late Joseon period. He came from the (new) Andong Kim clan (신 안동 김씨, 新 安東 金氏). He served as a minister in the royal court and orchestrated the Andong Kim clan's takeover of power. He was the father of Queen Sunwon. After his daughter became the Queen Consort, his son-in-law, Sunjo of Joseon, honored him as the Internal Prince Yeongan (영안 부원군, 永安 府院君).

Political influence
After Queen Jeongsun stepped down as regent, Kim Jo-sun, already held an influential court member, purged his political rivals to help secure the position of his family and political faction. This began the era of Sedo politics, or oligarchic rule, of the Andong Kim clan. Kim was a leading member of the Noron Faction. This marked the beginning of a sixty-year period, spanning the reign of three kings (Sunjo, Heonjong, and Cheoljong), in which the real power in the country was wielded by the Andong Kims.

Kim Jo-sun acted as regent for Sunjo, with the reins of power firmly in his grip. Local magistrates and provincial governors alike had to curry favor with the Andong Kim clan to maintain their positions. Kim Jo-sun's son, Kim Jwa-geun, took over the Andong Kim clan as it was attaining the height of its influence.

Family
 Great-great-great-great-great-great-great-great-grandfather
 Kim Saeng-hae (김생해, 金生海)
 Great-great-great-great-great-great-great-grandfather
 Kim Geuk-hyo (김극효, 金克孝) (16 September 1542 - 3 February 1618)
 Great-great-great-great-great-great-great-grandmother
 Lady Jeong of the Dongnae Jeong clan (동래 정씨)
 Great-great-great-great-great-great-grandfather
 Kim Sang-gwan (김상관, 金尙觀) (9 January 1556 – 12 May 1621)
 Great-great-great-great-great-grandfather
 Kim Gwang-chan (김광찬, 金光燦) (1597 - 24 February 1668)
 Great-great-great-great-great-grandmother
 Lady Kim of the Yeonan Kim clan (연안 김씨)
 Great-great-great-great-grandfather
 Kim Su-hang (김수항, 金壽恒) (1629 - 9 April 1689)
 Great-great-great-great-grandmother
 Lady Na of the Anjeong Na clan (안정 나씨)
 Great-great-grandfather
 King Chang-jib (김창집, 金昌集) (1648 - 2 May 1722)
 Great-great-grandmother
 Lady Park (박씨)
 Great-grandfather
 Kim Je-gyeom (김제겸, 金濟謙)
 Grandfather
 Kim Dal-haeng (김달행, 金達行)
Father
 Kim Yi-jung (김이중, 金履中)
Mother
Lady Shin of the Pyeongsan Shin clan (평산 신씨)
Grandfather: Shin Sa-jeok (신사적, 申思迪)
Grandmother: Lady Yi of the Hansan Yi clan (한산 이씨); daughter of Yi Jib (이집, 李潗)
Wife
 Internal Princess Consort Cheongyang of the Cheongsong Shim clan (청양부부인 청송 심씨, 靑陽府夫人 靑松沈氏) (1766 –1828)
 Father-in-law: Shim Geon-ji (심건지, 沈健之)
 Mother-in-law: Lady Yi of the Jeonju Yi clan (증 정경부인 전주 이씨); Shim Geon-ji’s 2nd wife
 Children
Son: Kim Yu-geun (김유근, 金逌根) (March 1785 – July 1840); became the adoptive son of Kim Yong-sun (김용순, 金龍淳)
 Adoptive grandson: Kim Byeon-ju (김병주, 金炳㴤); son of Kim Hong-geun (김홍근, 金弘根)
 Son: Kim Won-geun (김원근, 金元根) (1786 – 1832)
 Grandson: Kim Byeon-ji (김병지, 金炳地)
 Daughter: Queen Sunwon of the Andong Kim clan (순원왕후 김씨) (8 June 1789 – 21 September 1857)
 Son-in-law: King Sunjo of Joseon (순조대왕, 純祖大王) (29 July 1790 – 13 December 1834)
 Grandson: Yi Yeong, Crown Prince Hyomyeong (효명세자, 孝明世子) (18 September 1809 – 25 June 1830)
 Granddaughter: Princess Myeongon (명온공주) (1810 – 1832)
 Granddaughter: Princess Bokon (복온공주) (24 November 1818 – 10 June 1832)
 Unnamed grandson (1820 – 1820)
 Granddaughter: Princess Deokon (덕온공주) (1822 – 1844)
 Adoptive grandson: King Cheoljong of Joseon (25 July 1831 – 16 January 1864)
 Son: Kim Jwa-geun (김좌근, 金左根) (1797 – 5 June 1869)
 Daughter-in-law: Lady Yun (윤씨, 尹氏)
 Adoptive grandson: Kim Byeon-gi (김병기, 金炳冀) (1818 – 1875); son of Kim Yeong-geun (김영근, 金泳根)
 Adoptive granddaughter-in-law: Lady Nam (남씨, 南氏)
 Daughter: Lady Kim of the Andong Kim clan (신 안동 김씨, 新 安東 金氏)
 Son-in-law: Nam Gu-sun (남구순, 南久淳)
 Grandson: Nam Byeong-cheol, Duke Munjeong (남병철 문정공, 南秉哲) (1817 – 1863)
 Granddaughter: Lady Nam (남씨, 南氏)
 Grandson-in-law: Kim Byeong-gi (김병기, 金炳冀) (1818–1875); son of Kim Yeong-geun (김영근, 金泳根) and adoptive son of Kim Jwa-geun (김좌근, 金左根)
 Daughter: Lady Kim of the Andong Kim clan (신 안동 김씨, 新 安東 金氏)
 Son-in-law: Lee Gyeom-jae (이겸재, 李謙在)
 Daughter: Lady Kim of the Andong Kim clan (신 안동 김씨, 新 安東 金氏)
 Son-in-law: Lee Geung-woo (이긍우, 李肯愚)
 Son: Kim Son-geun (김손근, 金遜根)

Books
 Punggomunjib (풍고문집)
 Odaegeomhyeopjeon (오대검협전)

References 

1765 births
1832 deaths
Joseon scholar-officials
Andong Kim clan
18th-century Korean people
19th-century Korean people